The 2nd General Health Battalion (2GHB) was a unit of the 17th Sustainment Brigade. It was based at the Gallipoli Barracks in Enoggera, Queensland. The battalion was rapidly deployable to provide field medical support for land-based forces. This includes initial wound surgery, resuscitation and medium to high intensity nursing care, (surgical resuscitation) and medium to high intensity nursing care in the area of operations.

The unit was initially designated the 2nd Health Support Battalion, but was redesignated to 2GHB in late 2011.

As part of the Army Health Services restructure, as of 2022 the unit has been re-labelled as the 2nd Health Battalion.

References

Combat service support battalions of the Australian Army
Army medical units and formations of Australia
Medical battalions
Military units in Queensland